Šuoikkatjávri is a lake in the municipalities of Kvænangen and Kautokeino-Guovdageaidnu in Troms og Finnmark county, Norway. It serves as the reservoir for the Cårrujavrit Hydroelectric Power Station.

See also
List of lakes in Norway

References

Lakes of Troms og Finnmark
Kvænangen
Kautokeino